Safia Rural LLG is a local-level government (LLG) of Oro Province, Papua New Guinea.

Wards
01. Namudi (Nawaru language speakers)
02. Sinua
03. Moro
04. Jari
05. Tuturawaru/Bibira No.2
06. Safia
07. Obea
08. Foru
09. Karisoa
10. Kinjaki
11. Embesa
12. Koira
13. Domara

References

Local-level governments of Oro Province